Calafell is a village in the province of Tarragona and autonomous community of Catalonia, Spain.

Tourism
The town is located at the heart of the Baix Penedès region; the gateway to the Costa Daurada, its economy depends heavily on tourism. There are also notable historical sites like the Iberian Citadel and the Casa Barral Museum (house that belonged to Carlos Barral).

The GR 92 long distance footpath, which roughly follows the length of the Mediterranean coast of Spain, has a staging point at Calafell.

References

External links
 Calafell – On the route of the castles in Camp de Tarragona region – part I., in Catalonia, Spain (in English)
 Government data pages 

Municipalities in Baix Penedès